Julia Lee Stander  (born July 14, 1975) is an American actress. Her roles include Chantarelle/Lily/Anne Steele in Buffy the Vampire Slayer and Angel (1997–2004). She has also appeared in Charmed.

In 2006, Disneyland refurbished its Haunted Mansion attraction. For this project, Lee became the face and body of the character, Constance Hatchaway (voice by Kat Cressida). In 2007, Lee and Cressida's version of Constance was also installed in Walt Disney World's Mansion.

Filmography

Film

Television

External links
 Official site

Actresses from New Mexico
Living people
University of California, Irvine alumni
21st-century American actresses
1975 births
Actresses from Santa Fe, New Mexico